Francis Winton (ca 1829 – 1908) was a printer, publisher and politician in Newfoundland. He represented Bonavista in the Newfoundland House of Assembly from 1869 to 1873 as an Anti-Confederate.

The son of Henry D. Winton and Elizabeth Nicholson, he was born in St. John's. In 1860, he was publishing the St. John's Daily News in partnership with his brother. In 1866, he began publishing the Day Book, later the Morning Chronicle. By 1894, Winton had moved to Pittsburgh, Pennsylvania, where he owned a newspaper called the Morning Chronicle. Winton and his wife both died there in 1908.

References 

Members of the Newfoundland and Labrador House of Assembly
Year of birth uncertain
1908 deaths
Canadian newspaper publishers (people)
Newfoundland Colony people
British emigrants to the United States